Rufus Zenas Johnston (June 7, 1874 – July 4, 1959) was born in Lincolnton, North Carolina. He graduated from the United States Naval Academy in 1895. He received the Medal of Honor for actions at the United States occupation of Veracruz in 1914.  He is buried in Arlington National Cemetery. Johnston is also a recipient of the Navy Cross and served in the Battle of Santiago de Cuba, Boxer Rebellion, Philippine–American War and World War I.

Medal of Honor citation
Rank and organization: Lieutenant Commander Organization: U.S. Navy Born: 7 June 1874, Lincolnton, N.C. Accredited to: North Carolina Date of Issue: 12/04/1915

Johnston was awarded the Medal of Honor citation 

For distinguished conduct in battle, engagement of Vera Cruz, 22 April 1914; was regimental adjutant, and eminent and conspicuous in his conduct. He exhibited courage and skill in leading his men through the action of the 22d and in the final occupation of the city.

Family 

Johnston was the son of Robert Zenas, who was a Presbyterian minister, and Catherine Caldwell Johnston.

Johnston married Emma Pegram in 1903. The couple had three children: Rufus Zenas, Jr., Elizabeth, and Catherine.

See also

List of Medal of Honor recipients (Veracruz)
List of United States Naval Academy alumni (Medal of Honor)

References

External links

1874 births
1959 deaths
United States Navy Medal of Honor recipients
United States Naval Academy alumni
United States Navy admirals
Recipients of the Navy Cross (United States)
Burials at Arlington National Cemetery
Battle of Veracruz (1914) recipients of the Medal of Honor